Wayne Hynes (born May 29, 1969) is a Canadian-born German former professional ice hockey player. Hynes competed at the 2001 and 2002 IIHF World Championships as a member of the Germany men's national ice hockey team . He also played ice hockey at the 2002 Winter Olympics with Team Germany.

Coaching career
From 2007 to 2010 Hynes was a head coach in the German 2nd Bundesliga. In December 2014, his appointment as co-trainer for the Schwenninger Wild Wings was announced.

Awards and honours

Career statistics

Regular season and playoffs

International

References

External links

1969 births
Living people
Adler Mannheim players
German ice hockey centres
TuS Geretsried players
Hamburg Freezers players
Hannover Scorpions players
Ice hockey players at the 2002 Winter Olympics
Kassel Huskies players
SC Langnau players
Medicine Hat Tigers players
München Barons players
Olympic ice hockey players of Germany
Ice hockey people from Calgary
Schwenninger Wild Wings players
University of Calgary alumni